Felipa Muniveda was a Mozambican politician. In 1977 she was one of the first group of women elected to the People's Assembly.

Biography
Muniveda was a FRELIMO candidate in the 1977 parliamentary elections, in which she was one of the first group of 27 women elected to the People's Assembly.

References

Date of birth unknown
20th-century Mozambican women politicians
20th-century Mozambican politicians
FRELIMO politicians
Members of the Assembly of the Republic (Mozambique)
Possibly living people